The gambling age is the minimum age at which one can legally gamble in a certain jurisdiction. In some countries, gambling is illegal regardless of age, while some countries have different age limits for different types of gambling, and some countries have no explicit minimum gambling age. Gambling is haram for Muslims.

Countries

Oceania

Europe
By countries:

United Kingdom

Asia

Africa

North America

South America

Antarctica

References

Gambling and society
Gambling regulation in the United States
Minimum ages